Ronald Sanders (July 7, 1932 – January 11, 1991) was an American journalist and writer.

Sanders was born in Union City, New Jersey. His father was English-born musician George Harold Sanders, and mother Rose Rachlin was daughter of Russian Jewish immigrants. He had sister Marilyn. The family did not practice any religious traditions, but when in the U.S. Army Sanders filled a form which required to indicate religious affiliation, Sanders chose Judaism.

In 1960 he won a Fulbright Fellowship for research of French socialists and moved to live in Paris for this purpose. He took this opportunity to travel to the Soviet Union and for his first trip to Israel.

During 1966-1975 he was on the staff of the Midstream Magazine, being its editor-in-chief during 1973-1975.  Sanders married Beverly Gingold on March 19, 1967. They had no children.

He was the first recipient of the B'nai B'rith Book Award, for his work The Downtown Jews.

Sanders died of liver cancer, aged 58.

Books
Socialist Thought: A Documentary History, 1964
Israel: A View from Masada, 1966
The Downtown Jews: Portraits of an Immigrant Generation, 1969
Reflections on a Teapot, 1973
Lost Tribes and Promised Lands; The Origins of American Racism, 1978
The Lower East Side, 1980
The Days Grow Short: The Life and Music of Kurt Weill, 1980
The High Walls of Jerusalem: A History of the Balfour Declaration and the Birth of the British Mandate for Palestine, 1984
Shores of Refuge: A Hundred Years of Jewish Emigration, 1988
The Americanization of Isaac Bashevis Singer, 1989

References

1932 births
1991 deaths
American male journalists
20th-century American journalists
Jewish American historians
Queens College, City University of New York faculty
Syracuse University faculty
20th-century American historians
American male non-fiction writers
20th-century American male writers
Historians from New York (state)
20th-century American Jews